Maicol Verzotto (born 24 May 1988) is an Italian diver. He is the first Italian male diver to win a synchronized medal in a World Championship. A member of the sporting federation Sport Federation Federazione Italiana Nuoto, he is sponsored by the Fiamme Oro – Bolzano Nuoto.

References

External links
 

1988 births
Living people
Sportspeople from Brixen
Italian male divers
World Aquatics Championships medalists in diving
Divers at the 2016 Summer Olympics
Olympic divers of Italy
Divers of Fiamme Oro